The men's team pursuit competition at the 2020  UEC European Track Championships was held on 11 and 12 November 2020.

Results

Qualifying
All teams advanced to the first round.

First round
First round heats were held as follows:
Heat 1: 5th v 6th fastest
Heat 2: 2nd v 3rd fastest
Heat 3: 1st v 4th fastest

The winners of heats 2 and 3 proceeded to the gold medal race. The remaining four teams were ranked on time, from which the top two proceeded to the bronze medal race.

Finals

References

Men's team pursuit
European Track Championships – Men's team pursuit